Örebro County held a county council election on 19 September 2010, on the same day as the general and municipal elections.

Results
The number of seats remained at 71 with the Social Democrats winning the most at 31, the same number as in 2006. The party won 44.4% of a vote total of 178,506.

Municipalities

Images

References

Elections in Örebro County
Örebro